Iain Sinclair FRSL (born 11 June 1943) is a writer and filmmaker. Much of his work is rooted in London, recently within the influences of psychogeography.

Biography

Education
Sinclair was born in Cardiff in 1943. From 1956 to 1961, he was educated at Cheltenham College, a boarding school for boys, followed by Trinity College, Dublin (where he edited Icarus). He attended the Courtauld Institute of Art (University of London), and the London School of Film Technique (now the London Film School).

Development as author

Sinclair's early work was mostly poetry, much of it published by his own small press, Albion Village Press. He was (and remains) connected with the British avant garde poetry scene of the 1960s and 1970s – authors such as Edward Dorn, J. H. Prynne, Douglas Oliver, Peter Ackroyd and Brian Catling are often quoted in his work and even turn up in fictionalized form as characters. Later, taking over from John Muckle, Sinclair edited the Paladin Poetry Series and, in 1996, the Picador anthology Conductors of Chaos.

His early books Lud Heat (1975) and Suicide Bridge (1979) were a mixture of essay, fiction and poetry; they were followed by White Chappell, Scarlet Tracings (1987), a novel juxtaposing the tale of a disreputable band of bookdealers on the hunt for a priceless copy of Arthur Conan Doyle's A Study in Scarlet and the Jack the Ripper murders (here attributed to the physician William Gull).

Sinclair was for some time perhaps best known for the novel Downriver (1991), which won the James Tait Black Memorial Prize and the 1992 Encore Award. It envisages the UK under the rule of 'the Widow', a grotesque version of Margaret Thatcher as viewed by her harshest critics, who supposedly establishes a one-party state in a fifth term. Radon Daughters, a novel influenced by the work of William Hope Hodgson, formed the third part of a trilogy with White Chappell, Scarlet Tracings and Downriver.

The volume of essays Lights Out for the Territory gained Sinclair a wider readership by treating the material of his novels in non-fiction form.  His essay Sorry Meniscus (1999) ridiculed the Millennium Dome.  In 1997, he collaborated with Chris Petit, sculptor Steve Dilworth, and others to make The Falconer, a 56-minute semi-fictional "documentary" film set in London and the Outer Hebrides, about the British underground filmmaker Peter Whitehead. It also features Stewart Home, Kathy Acker and Howard Marks.

Sinclair was elected a Fellow of the Royal Society of Literature in 2009. In October 2018, the University of Surrey reported that Sinclair had been appointed "distinguished writer in residence" with their School of Literature and Languages.  In 2013 he became a visiting professor at the University for the Creative Arts. In an interview with This Week in Science, William Gibson said that Sinclair was his favourite author.

Psychogeography

A significant proportion of Sinclair's work has consisted of an ambitious and elaborate literary recuperation of the so-called occultist psychogeography of London. Other psychogeographers who have worked on similar material include Will Self, Stewart Home, Michael Moorcock and the London Psychogeographical Association.

One of a series of works focused around London is the non-fiction London Orbital, the hardcover edition of which was published in 2002, along with a documentary film of the same name and subject. It describes a series of trips he took tracing the M25, London's outer-ring motorway, on foot. Sinclair followed this with Edge of the Orison in 2005, a psychogeographical reconstruction of the poet John Clare's walk from Dr Matthew Allen's private lunatic asylum, at Fairmead House, High Beach, in Epping Forest in Essex, to his home in Helpston, near Peterborough. Sinclair also writes about Claybury Asylum, another psychiatric hospital in Essex, in Rodinsky's Room, a collaboration with the artist Rachel Lichtenstein.

Sinclair's book Ghost Milk criticized the British government for using the 2012 Summer Olympics as an excuse to militarize London while forcing the poorest citizens out of their homes. The 2012 games mark a shift in Sinclair's psychogeographical writing, moving to a more documentary mode with fewer semi-fictional elements included in his work. In 2017 Sinclair published The Last London, a conscious move away from writing about "A city so much estranged from its earlier identities (always shifting and revising) that it is unrecognisable." This marked the culmination of a series of works that detailed Sinclair's attempts to grasp the changing nature of London and to re-map his own experiences of the city.

Sinclair's own view of psychogeography later echoed many of the earlier criticisms of his work which focused on the commodification of 'heritage zones' in less affluent areas of the city. In a 2016 interview, he stated: "I don’t think there is any more than can be said. The topic has outlived its usefulness and become a brand."

The Reforgotten

A consistent theme in Sinclair's non-fiction and semi-fictional works has been the rediscovery of writers who enjoyed success in the early 20th century, but have been largely forgotten. These writers predominantly focus on London, particularly the East London districts in which Sinclair has lived and worked. He has written about, championed and contributed introductory notes to novels by authors such as Robert Westerby, Roland Camberton, Alexander Baron and John Healy. His 2016 work My Favourite London Devils focused on his rediscovery and appreciation of these writers, often while working as a used book dealer.

Peru

In June 2019, Sinclair travelled to Lima to begin retracing the journey of his great-grandfather, Arthur Sinclair, to "the source of the Amazon". Travelling with his daughter, Farne, filmmaker Grant Gee, and poet and translator Adolfo Barberá del Rosal, the journey was expected to result in a range of artistic responses including podcasts, film and various books. The journey was partly funded by the British Film Institute's documentary fund and part by crowdfunding. The expedition provided material for an essay-feature film entitled The Gold Machine, released in 2022. A book by Sinclair with the same title was also published in 2021. A small selection of prose-poetry inspired by the trip was published by Earthbound Press.

Personal life
Iain Sinclair lives in Haggerston, in the London Borough of Hackney and has a flat in Marine Court, the art-deco building modelled after an ocean liner in St Leonards-on-Sea, East Sussex.

Bibliography

 Back Garden Poems, poetry, 1970
 The Kodak Mantra Diaries: Allen Ginsberg in London, documentary, 1971
 Muscat's Wurm, poetry, 1972
 The Birth Rug, poetry, 1973
 Lud Heat, prose and poetry, 1975
 Suicide Bridge, prose and poetry, 1979
 Flesh Eggs and Scalp Metal, poetry, 1983
 Autistic poses, poetry, 1985
 Flesh Eggs and Scalp Metal: Selected Poems 1970–1987, poetry, Paladin, 1987
 Significant wreckage, poetry, 1988
 White Chappell, Scarlet Tracings, fiction, 1987 (originally a limited edition from Goldmark but reprinted by Paladin)
 Downriver, novel, 1991
 Jack Elam's Other Eye, poetry, 1991
 The Shamanism of Intent, Goldmark, 1991
 Radon Daughters, novel, 1994
 Conductors of Chaos: a Poetry Anthology, editor 1996
 Penguin Modern Poets Volume Ten: Douglas Oliver, Denise Riley, Iain Sinclair, poetry, 1996
 The Ebbing of the Kraft, poetry, 1997

 , non-fiction
 Slow Chocolate Autopsy, fiction, 1997
 Crash, essay, 1999
 Liquid City, non-fiction, 1999 (with Marc Atkins)
 Rodinsky's Room, non-fiction, 1999 (with Rachel Lichtenstein)
 Sorry Meniscus, essay, Profile Books, 1999
 Landor's Tower, novel, 2001
 London Orbital, non-fiction, 2002
 White Goods, poems, essays, fictions, 2002
 Saddling The Rabbit, poetry, 2002 Etruscan Books
 The Verbals - in conversation with Kevin Jackson, Worple Press, 2003
 Dining on Stones, novel, 2004
 Edge of the Orison: In the Traces of John Clare's 'Journey Out Of Essex''', non-fiction, 2005
 The Firewall (selected poems 1979 – 2006), poetry, Etruscan Books, paperback, 2006
 Buried At Sea, Worple Press, paperback, 2006
 London: City of Disappearances, editor, various essays about London psychogeography etc., 2006
 Hackney, That Rose-Red Empire: A Confidential Report, non-fiction, 2009
 “Sickening”, in Restless Cities, Edited by M. Beaumont and G. Dart, London: Verso, 2010. 257–276.
 Ghost Milk, non-fiction (memoir), 2011
 Blake's London: The Topographical Sublime, The Swedenborg Society, 2012
 Kitkitdizze... Seeing Gary Snyder, Beat Scene, January 2013
 Swimming To Heaven: The Lost Rivers of London, The Swedenborg Society, 2013
 Austerlitz and After: Tracking Sebald, chapter deleted from 'American Smoke', Test Centre, 2013
 Red Eye, poetry, Test Centre, 2013
 Objects of Obscure Desire, Goldmark, 2013 (illustrated by Sarah Simblet)
 American Smoke: Journeys to the End of the Light, 2014
 Cowboy / Deleted File, chapter deleted from 'American Smoke', Test Centre, 2014
 London Overground: A Day's Walk around the Ginger Line, 2015
 Black Apples of Gower, Little Toller Books, 2015
 Westering, Test Centre, 2015
 Liquid City, Expanded edition, non-fiction, Reaktion Books, 2016 (with Marc Atkins)
 Seeschlange, Equipage, 2016
 My Favourite London Devils: A Gazetteer of Encounters with Local Scribes, Elective Shamen & Unsponsored Keepers of the Sacred Flame, Tangerine Press, 2016
 The Last London: True Fictions from an Unreal City, Oneworld Publications, 2017
 Living with Buildings: Walking with Ghosts – On Health and Architecture, Wellcome, 2018
 Dark Before Dark, Tangerine Press, 2019 (photography by Anonymous Bosch)
 Fever Hammer Yellow – Earthbound Poetry Series Vol.1 No.7, Earthbound Press, 2020
 Our Late Familiars – Goldmark, 2020 (photography by Ian Wilkinson)
 The Gold Machine - In the Tracks of the Mule Dancers - Oneworld Publications, 2021
 The Gold Machine Beats: A Jungle Death Photo Album - Beat Scene, 2021
 
  (with artwork by Dave McKean, postscript by Chris McCabe)

Filmography
As well as writing and directing a number of documentary and semi-documentary films, Sinclair has appeared as himself in a number of films by other directors:

Discography

 1998 - Downriver, (UK, King Mob Records, CD)
 2004 - Dead Lead Office - Poems 1970-2004, (UK, Optic Nerve, CD)
 2012 - Stone Tape Shuffle, (UK, Test Centre, LP)
 2016 - Edith Field Recordings with David Aylward, Anonymous Bosch, Andrew Kötting, Jem Finer, Claudia Barton, (UK, BadBloodandSibyl, CD)
 2016 - London Overground with Standard Planets, (UK, Fin-A-Dee Six Records, 12" Single)
 2021 - Dark Before Dark with The London Experimental Ensemble, (USA, 577 Records, CD)

References

External links
 Iain Sinclair Official Unofficial WebSite (Sanctioned by Author)
 "A Small Catalogue of the Uncurated" by Sinclair (archived 2009-11-24) at Untitled Books "Iain Sinclair" (2002) in The Literary Encyclopedia Iain Sinclair at Complete Review''
 "Reader Flattery – Iain Sinclair and the Colonisation of East London" (2006), a critical analysis by John Barker in Mute (MetaMute.org)
 

1943 births
Living people
Alumni of the Courtauld Institute of Art
Alumni of the London Film School
Alumni of Trinity College Dublin
British art critics
British Poetry Revival
Fellows of the Royal Society of Literature
James Tait Black Memorial Prize recipients
People associated with The Institute for Cultural Research
People educated at Cheltenham College
People from the London Borough of Hackney
Psychogeographers
Welsh novelists
Welsh poets
Writers from Cardiff